Stags Leap, Stag's Leap or Stags' Leap  can refer to 

 Stags Leap District AVA, viticultural area in Napa Valley, California
 Stag's Leap Wine Cellars, wine producer in the Stags Leap District owned by Ste. Michelle/Antinori
 Stags' Leap Winery, wine producer in the Stags Leap District owned by Beringer Estates
 Stag's Leap (book), 2012 book of poetry